General elections were held in India in five phases between 16 April 2009 and 13 May 2009 to elect the members of the 15th Lok Sabha. With an electorate of 716 million, it was the largest democratic election in the world until being surpassed by the 2014 general election.

By constitutional requirement, elections to the Lok Sabha must be held every five years or when Parliament is dissolved by the president. The previous elections were held in May 2004 and the term of the 14th Lok Sabha would have naturally expired on 1 June 2009. Elections are organised by the Election Commission of India (ECI) and are normally held in multiple phases to better handle the large electorate and security concerns. The 2009 elections were held in five phases. In February 2009, Rs.11.20 billion ($200.5 million) was budgeted for election expenses by parliament.

A total of 8,070 candidates contested 543 seats elected in single-member constituencies using first-past-the-post voting. Voter turnout over all five phases was around 58%. The results of the election were announced within three days of phase five, on 16 May.

The United Progressive Alliance (UPA) led by the Indian National Congress formed the government after winning a majority of seats, with strong results in Andhra Pradesh, Kerala, Maharashtra, Rajasthan, Tamil Nadu, Uttar Pradesh and West Bengal. Manmohan Singh became the first Prime Minister since Jawaharlal Nehru in 1962 to be re-elected after completing a full five-year term. The UPA was able to put together a comfortable majority with support from 322 of the 543 elected members. External support was provided by the Bahujan Samaj Party (BSP), Samajwadi Party (SP), Janata Dal (Secular) (JD(S)), Rashtriya Janata Dal (RJD) and other minor parties.

Singh was sworn in as Prime Minister on 22 May 2009 at the Ashoka Hall of Rashtrapati Bhavan.

Background

The election, while following the normal five-year cycle, came after a break in the old UPA alliance after the left parties withdrew support of the Indo-US nuclear deal forcing a vote of confidence (which the government won).

Electoral issues

Delimitation

The 2009 elections adopted re-drawn electoral constituencies based on the 2001 census, following the 2002 Delimitation Commission of India, whose recommendations were approved in February 2008.

In the 2009 general elections, 499 out of the total 543 Parliamentary constituencies were newly delimited constituencies. This affected the National Capital Region of Delhi, the Union Territory of Puducherry and all the states except Arunachal Pradesh, Assam, Jammu & Kashmir, Jharkhand, Manipur and Nagaland.
While comparing election results, it must be borne in mind that in many instances a constituency with the same name may reflect a significantly different population demographic as well as a slightly altered geographical region.

Electronic voting machines

As in the 2004 election, this election was also conducted completely using electronic voting machines (EVMs), with 1,368,430 voting machines deployed across the country.

Polling stations

There were 828,804 Polling Stations around the country – a 20% increase over the number from the 2004 election. This was done mainly to avoid vulnerability to threat and intimidation, to overcome geographical barriers and to reduce the distance travelled by voters.

The CEC announced that the polling station in Banej village in the Una segment of Junagadh, Gujarat had the unique claim to being the only polling station in the country that catered to a single elector – Guru Shree Bharatdasji Bapu, a priest of a Shiva temple in the middle of the Gir Forest.

Electoral rolls
The electoral rolls had to be completely updated because of the delimitation that took effect from February 2008. The process of updating the electoral rolls continued until the last date of filing nominations. 714 million people were eligible to vote in 2009, up 6.4% (43 million) from 2004.

This election also saw the entire country except the states of Assam, Nagaland and Jammu & Kashmir use photo electoral rolls. This meant that the photo of each elector was printed on the electoral rolls and this was intended to facilitate easy identification and prevent impersonations.

In addition to the photo electoral rolls, the electors also needed to provide separate photo identification. Those electors who had already been issued Electoral Photo Identification Cards (EPIC) were only permitted to use the EPIC for identification at the polling station. According to the EC, 82% of the country's electors (except those in Assam) have been issued EPIC before the 2009 election was announced.

Polling schedule

Background
The Chief Election Commissioner of India (CEC), N. Gopalaswami, had stated on 28 December 2008, that the elections were likely to be held between April and May 2009. He attributed this schedule to the examination period from February to March, making polling places unavailable.

On 31 January 2009, fractures within the Election Commission came to the fore when Gopalaswami recommended to President Pratibha Patil that Election Commissioner Navin Chawla be sacked for behaving in a partisan manner. This recommendation in itself was controversial, as it was unclear if a CEC had the legal and constitutional right to provide such a unilateral recommendation. Chawla refused to resign as he was expected to take over the post of Chief Election Commissioner a few months later.

This controversy also resulted in speculation that the Election Commission was unable to agree on the actual polling dates, with the incumbent CEC Gopalaswami preferring that at least one phase of elections be held before his retirement on 20 April 2009. Navin Chawla, on the other hand, wanted the election to only start after Gopalaswami retired.

Eventually, on 1 March 2009, President Patil rejected Gopalaswami's recommendation to remove Chawla after the Government advised her to do so. Soon after the above announcement by President Patil, the Election Commissioners got together to announce the details of the general election.

The polling schedule for the 2009 General Elections was announced by the Chief Election Commissioner on 2 March 2009.

Subsequently, the President's House announced on 4 March 2009 that CEC Gopalaswami would retire as scheduled on 20 April 2009 and Navin Chawla would take over as CEC starting 21 April 2009. It was the first time in the history of Indian politics that two different people oversaw different phases of the same election.

Polling schedule

Coalitions
The 2009 general election saw three main national pre-poll alliances. Given the volatile nature of coalition politics in India, many parties changed alliances before, during and after the elections. The two larger coalitions, UPA and NDA, had clearly indicated their prime ministerial candidates during campaigning for the election. The Third Front announced repeatedly through the campaigning period that their prime ministerial candidate would only be decided after the election results came out. In Indian parliamentary system, the announcement of Prime Ministerial candidates prior to elections is not required.

United Progressive Alliance

Prime Minister candidate: Manmohan Singh (Indian National Congress (INC))

The United Progressive Alliance (UPA) was formed after the 2004 general election to bring together parties that either allied with the Congress in various states, or were willing to support a Congress-led national government. Though the UPA never enjoyed a clear majority on its own in the 14th Lok Sabha, it managed to complete its five-year term from 2004 to 2009 by securing outside support from the left parties (CPI(M), CPI, AIFB, RSP), Samajwadi Party and Bahujan Samaj Party at different times during this tenure.

Following the August 2008 confidence vote victory for the current government, a statement by Congress President Sonia Gandhi caused speculation that the UPA would project Prime Minister Manmohan Singh as the Prime Ministerial candidate in the next elections. While Dravida Munnetra Kazhagam (DMK) leader M. Karunanidhi supported Manmohan Singh as the PM candidate, Nationalist Congress Party (NCP) chief Sharad Pawar tried to project himself as a possible Prime Ministerial candidate as well. On 24 January 2009, Manmohan Singh underwent a cardiac bypass surgery at the All India Institute of Medical Sciences, New Delhi. Following the surgery, speculation of alternate PM candidates arose both within the Congress and amongst coalition partners. In an attempt to quell such speculations, Sonia Gandhi on 6 February 2009, confirmed that Manmohan Singh would be the UPA's PM candidate by writing so in the Congress party magazine Sandesh. This was the first time in the history of Indian elections that the Congress party had declared its Prime Ministerial candidate prior to the elections.

National Democratic Alliance

Prime Minister candidate: Lal Krishna Advani (Bharatiya Janata Party (BJP))

The National Democratic Alliance (NDA) was the first large national coalition formed by a national party supported by various regional parties. It was formed after the 1998 general election and the NDA formed the Government led by BJP's Atal Bihari Vajpayee. The government collapsed a few months later, but the NDA returned to power after the 1999 general election and this time the Vajpayee-led Government completed its full term from 1999 to 2004. Due to the volatile nature of coalitions, NDA won 181 seats after the 2004 election, but due to parties changing alliances, before the 2009 election they had 142 seats.

The main opposition party, BJP, and its NDA coalition partners announced on 11 December 2007 (more than a year before the election) that their candidate for prime minister would be BJP party leader Advani who was the Leader of the Opposition at the time. On 23 January 2008, leaders from BJP and other NDA parties convened in the capital to officially elect him as their candidate for the election.

Third Front
Seats: The newly formed alliance carried with them 109 seats before the 2009 election.
The CPI(M) led the formation of the Third Front for the 2009 election. This front was basically a collection of regional political parties who were neither in UPA nor in the NDA. Most of the constituents of this Third Front were those who were part of the United Progressive Alliance (UPA).

Fourth Front
Seats: The newly formed alliance carried with them 64 seats before the 2009 election.
The Samajwadi Party, Rashtriya Janata Dal and the Lok Janshakti Party failed to reach seat sharing agreements with the Congress and decided to form a new front, hoping to be kingmakers after the election. Despite announcing this front, the constituent parties continued to declare their support for the UPA.

Campaign

United Progressive Alliance
The Congress party bought the rights for the Oscar-winning soundtrack "Jai Ho" from the movie Slumdog Millionaire, which was used as the official campaign tune by the party. The song title "Jai Ho" translates to 'Let there be victory', and the Congress hoped that the popular song would galvanise the masses during the almost one-month-long election season.

On 24 March 2009, Congress President Sonia Gandhi released the party's manifesto for the 2009 election. The manifesto highlighted all the achievements of the UPA Government over the last five years in power and identified improving various policies to favour more rural & under-privileged sections of the Indian society.

The Congress campaign ran into trouble when the Election Commission took exception to a full page advertisement on the 2010 Commonwealth Games taken out in major Delhi newspapers. The EC served notice to the Ministry of Youth Affairs and Sports, the Cabinet Secretary and the Chief Secretary of Delhi, stating that the advertisement was a clear violation of the model code of conduct since it enumerated the achievements of the UPA Government. The EC has also asked the violators to pay from their own pockets.

National Democratic Alliance
To counter the Congress' selection of "Jai Ho" as their official anthem, the BJP coined the phrase Kushal Neta,

On 3 April 2009, BJP released its election manifesto in New Delhi. The party was taking on the incumbent UPA Government on the three fronts of Good Governance, Development and Security. The manifesto highlighted all the different NDA policies that the UPA reversed over the last five years. The manifesto laid a lot of importance on requiring strong, POTA-like anti-terrorism laws and vowed to make India a safer place if the BJP is elected. The full text of the manifesto is available at the BJP website.

The BJP campaign faced its biggest controversy when the EC directed the District Magistrate of Pilibhit to lodge a criminal case against the BJP's candidate Varun Gandhi for his allegedly inflammatory speech against minority communities made on 7 March 2009. This decision was taken after the EC had earlier issued a notice to Varun Gandhi and the BJP. After reviewing the incident, the EC found Varun Gandhi guilty of violating the model code of conduct by creating feeling of enmity and hatred between different communities and issued a recommendation the BJP to drop him from their list of candidates. The BJP however came out in support of Varun and refused to drop him as a candidate.

Third Front
The Communist Party of India (Marxist) (CPI(M)) formed a Third Front. The Third Front tried to contest the election, hoping to create a non-BJP, non-Congress government, by attracting many local and regional parties, that were once with the other two alliances. The Third Front came into the alliance with 109 MPs, and various polling conducted before the election projected the alliance of getting over 100 seats. The CPI(M) created a campaign website hosting its campaign information to attract sympathisers among the netizen public to vote for the party.

Innovative technology usage during campaigning
During this election, political parties used technology in innovative ways to reach out to the voters. Although SMS had been used during prior elections, political parties had realised that the rural and illiterate voters which form a majority could not read. Young and technology savvy politicians quickly realised that voice was the way to reach out to the rural community as they could speak their language. This turned out to be very interesting as two voice companies from India, TringMe and VoiceHawk played the pivotal role in reaching out to the billion people of India.

Opinion polling
Most opinion polls conducted by major agencies gave the UPA an edge over the NDA, but none were predicted to get absolute majority. The UPA including the Fourth front was, however, predicted by a few to get seats close to majority. The opinion polls reckoned that other regional parties would play an important role by winning a substantial number of seats. In results where the "Fourth Front" is indicated, the SP, RJD and LJP are not being counted in the UPA figure.

Pre-poll surveys

Exit polls
In February 2009, the ECI banned the publishing of all exit polls starting 48 hours before Phase 1 of the election until the end of Phase 5. This was intended to prevent exit polls from earlier phases affecting voter decisions in later phases. The ban ended with the close of Phase 5 voting at 5:00 pm IST on 13 May.

Election phases

Phase 1 – 16 April 2009
The first phase of the 2009 election took place on Thursday, 16 April with elections in 124 constituencies across 15 states and 2 union territories. There were incidents of violence in a few places in Chhattisgarh, Orissa, Bihar, Jharkhand and Maharashtra and between 17 and 19 people were killed in Naxal attacks. The dead included five poll officials and 10 security personnel, whose families received a compensation of Rs 1 million. Naxals set fire to voting machines, attacked voters, security personnel and polling workers, and destroyed vehicles. According to one news source, "It was apparent that the Naxals had clearly planned to disrupt the polls."

Despite these incidents, the ECI expressed satisfaction about the conduct of the polls due to peaceful polling in many other parts of the country. Initial reports from the ECI place the voter turnout for this phase at approximately 60 percent. This phase of the election was held in 185,000 polling stations, serving an electorate of over 143.1 million deciding the fate of 1,715 candidates.

The ECI ordered repoll in 46 polling booths across 7 of the states where polling took place in the first phase. These include 29 polling booths in Andhra Pradesh, 5 each in Assam and Arunachal Pradesh, 3 in Nagaland, 2 in Kerala and 1 each in Jammu & Kashmir and Uttar Pradesh. The repoll in all these polling booths were held on 18 April 2009.

One of the positive stories emerging from this phase of election was from Kandhamal district, where refugees of the 2008 Kandhamal riots came out in huge numbers to exercise their franchise. It is estimated that there was a turnout of 90% amongst Kandhamal refugees and 50% across the entire district. The administration had earlier identified large parts of the area as Naxal affected and vulnerable. Hence, the administration had deployed extra security in the area and the ECI has arranged for special transport to shuttle the refugees from the refugee camps to the polling booths. Both of these actions helped achieve the high turnout.

Phase 2 – 22 April 2009 and 23 April 2009
The second phase of the 2009 election was spread across Wednesday, 22 April (Phase 2A) and Thursday, 23 April (Phase 2B). Phase 2A saw election in a single constituency in Manipur as it was a state holiday on 23 April.

According to the EC, the election in Manipur in Phase 2A was peaceful and witnessed a voter turnout of about 62%. Following the election, though, the Communist Party of India (CPI) and Manipur People's Party (MPP) have alleged vote rigging by Congress workers during the polls in Phase 2A. The MPP claimed that the Congress workers captured 11 booths in the Andro Assembly segment of Imphal East.

Phase 2B saw polling in 12 states for 140 constituencies – the most in any phase of this election. This phase was largely peaceful and saw about 55% turnout. There were stray incidents of violence in areas with active Naxalite groups in Jharkhand and Bihar. The poor turnout in this phase was blamed on a heat wave sweeping the country that took the noon-time temperature on election day up to between 42 and 46 degrees Celsius in various parts of the country. Two polling officials even died due to sun stroke in Orissa with two also falling ill.

Phase 3 – 30 April 2009
The third phase of the 2009 election was held on Thursday, 30 April with elections in 107 constituencies spread across nine states and two union territories. The fate of 1,567 candidates was decided in this phase including those of Congress President Sonia Gandhi, BJP's Prime Minister candidate L.K. Advani and former Prime Minister and Janata Dal (Secular) President Deve Gowda. This phase included voting in Mumbai where the turnout was relatively low. The voter turnout around the country was moderate and this was primarily blamed on the extreme heat on election day. Voting was largely peaceful all across the country. However, Maoist guerrillas exploded a landmine in West Bengal's Purulia district, injuring a paramilitary trooper.

Phase 4 – 7 May 2009

The fourth phase of the election was held on Thursday, 7 May with elections for 85 seats across eight states involving 1,315 candidates. The phase's high-profile candidates included External Affairs Minister Pranab Mukherjee and former chief ministers Mulayam Singh Yadav, Rajnath Singh, Lalu Prasad Yadav and Farooq Abdullah. Apart from bomb attacks in West Bengal's Asansol and Murshidabad districts that killed one person each and some violence in Rajasthan, this phase was relatively peaceful. This phase saw voting in the nation's capital Delhi where the voter turnout was around 53%, much higher than the previous two elections in Delhi.

Phase 5 – 13 May 2009
The fifth and final phase of the 2009 election was held on Wednesday, 13 May with voting across seven states and two union territories for 86 constituencies. Overall the turnout was 62%. Numerous cases of voter omissions were reported in Tamil Nadu which had 39 seats up for grab. In Jammu & Kashmir, two polling stations could not be reached by the polling officials due to extreme snow which prevented their helicopters from landing at the site. The polling officials were forced to trek through deep snow to reach the polling stations and polls took place 2 days later on 15 May in these two stations. A few cases of violence were also reported in this phase. One DMK official was stabbed to death in Tamil Nadu in a clash between the political parties and another person was killed in West Bengal in clashes between Trinamool Congress and CPI(M) party workers.

State/UT-wise voter turnout details

Results

Vote counting took place on 16 May and the result were declared the same day. The EVMs were localised to 1,080 centres across the country and counting started at 08:00 hrs. The United Progressive Alliance (UPA) took early lead and maintained it to emerge victorious. Bharatiya Janata Party (BJP) leader Rajnath Singh said that the BJP's performance in the election was very unexpected and the success of the NDA that had been hoped for had not materialised. The CPI (M) led third front later said that it was ready to sit in the opposition.

By Region

By states and territories

The UPA carried 18 states, while the NDA and the Third Front carried 8 and 2 respectively.

Source: Election Commission of India

Analysis
This election defied the predictions made by pre-poll predictions and exit polls and resulted in a new mandate for incumbent UPA government. According to analysts after the election, many factors can be attributed for a landslide. The National Election Study 2009, published in The Hindu newspaper after the election, attributed the victory of the UPA government to the saturation of caste-based identity politics, focus on good governance and BJP's limitations. Another factor was the vote-splitting by the Third Front, especially the BSP and MNS in Maharashtra, which resulted in the Indian National Congress gaining many of its seats without getting a majority in the corresponding constituency.

Formation of the new government

The President, Pratibha Patil dissolved the 14th Lok Sabha with immediate effect on 18 May. Prime Minister Manmohan Singh submitted the resignation of his Council of Ministers to the President, for him to be re-elected as the Prime Minister as well as for a new Council of Ministers to be elected. On 19 May, Manmohan Singh and Sonia Gandhi were re-elected as party leader and chairperson respectively of the Congress Parliamentary Party. This effectively made him the prime minister-elect of the new government. President Pratibha Patil invited Singh to then form the new government on 20 May. The new government was sworn in on 22 May.

Government formation
Due to the fact that UPA was able to get 262 seats – just short of 10 seats for a majority – all the external support came from parties who gave unconditional support to Manmohan Singh and the UPA. The Janata Dal, the Rashtriya Janata Dal, the Bahujan Samaj Party and the Samajwadi Party all decided to do so to keep out any possibility of a BJP government in the next 5 years. Nagaland Peoples Front, Sikkim Democratic Front, and Bodaland Peoples Front, each with an MP, decided to join and support the UPA government. The three independent candidates to extend support for UPA were all from Maharashtra, and they were Sadashiv Mandlik, from Kolhapur constituency, Raju Shetty, from the political party Swabhimani Paksha, who won from Hatkandagle and Baliram Jadhav from Bahujan Vikas Aghadi party who won the Palghar constituency.

On 21 May, it was announced that the Dravida Munnetra Kazhagam (DMK) had decided to leave and give outside support to the UPA government, due to failed talks between the Congress and the DMK on cabinet positions. After many deliberations between DMK and Congress, the DMK agreed to 3 cabinet ministers and 4 ministers of state. Kanimozhi, daughter of the DMK leader M. Karunanidhi, decided not to join the new government cabinet, instead she wanted to focus on improving the parties image. The two incumbent cabinet ministers from DMK, Dayanidhi Maran and A. Raja joined the cabinet, but due to concerns raised by Prime Minister Manmohan Singh on T.R. Baalu, he was dropped from the cabinet, and Karunanidhi's son M.K. Azhagiri, replaced him as part of a compromise. On 25 May 2009, DMK decided to join the UPA government, reversing the decision made in prior days to extend outside support.

References

External links
Official website
Lok Sabha General Elections 2019 – Parliamentary Polls 2019 India News 
Official website of the Election Commission of India
 News websites
News Coverages of General Elections 2009 – NDTV
Graphical Representation of General Elections 2009 for All States in India – NationsRoot
News Coverages of General Elections 2009 – CNN-IBN
News Coverages of General Elections 2009 – Sify
Information About India Elections
News Coverages of General Elections – Wionews
 Archived websites
Indian General Elections 2009 Web Archive from the US Library of Congress

Further reading
Arora, Balveer & Tawa Lama-Rewal, Stéphanie (eds). Contests in Context: Indian Elections 2009. South Asia Multidisciplinary Academic Journal. Issue 3, 2009.

 
2009 elections in India
2009 in India
April 2009 events in India
May 2009 events in India
General elections in India